Acrocercops helicopa is a moth of the family Gracillariidae. It is known from India (Uttaranchal). It was described by Edward Meyrick in 1919.

References

helicopa
Moths of Asia
Moths described in 1919